Peter Hajba (born 15 December 1974), also known by his demoscene nickname Skaven, is a Finnish electronic musician, video game composer and graphic artist. His most recent project is with Remedy Entertainment as an animator, sound designer and graphic artist. Prior to working with Remedy, Hajba has been credited on games developed by 3D Realms, PopCap Games, Introversion Software Limited, Epic Games, and Housemarque.

Hajba was a member of the widely popular but now defunct demoscene group Future Crew, which produced some highly acclaimed demos during the 1990s. Despite having no formal training, he has won numerous awards for his music, including winning the Assembly music competition in 1993, 1995 and 2002.

In 2005, Hajba composed the soundtrack for the Text Mode Demo Contest invitation demo.

As of 2012, Hajba now regularly releases tracks on his SoundCloud page.

Video game credits

 1998 – GLtron
 1999 – Unreal Tournament – music for the "Peak Monastery" and "Liandri Core" level
 2001 – Bejeweled
 2001 – Uplink
 2001 – Seven Seas Deluxe
 2001 – Max Payne – Particle effects, character animation and sound effects
 2001 – Alchemy Deluxe
 2002 – Dynomite Deluxe
 2002 – Codename Silver
 2002 – Bookworm Deluxe
 2002 – Big Money! Deluxe
 2003 – Warblade
 2003 – Sweet Tooth To Go
 2003 – Max Payne 2: The Fall of Max Payne – Particle effects, sound design and voice engineering
 2004 – Bejeweled 2 Deluxe
 2004 – Hamsterball
 2007 – PopCap Hits! Vol 1
 2007 – PopCap Arcade Vol 1
 2008 – Bejeweled Twist
 2009 – Boonka
 2010 – Bejeweled 3
 2010 – Alan Wake – Sound design, particle effects, additional graphics
 2011 – Death Rally
 2011 – Bejeweled Blitz Live
 2012 – Alan Wake's American Nightmare
 2019 - Generation Zero

References

External links
 
 Skaven at The Mod Archive
 Skaven at SoundCloud

1974 births
Demosceners
Living people
Finnish animators
Finnish audio engineers
Finnish electronic musicians
Place of birth missing (living people)
Sound designers
Tracker musicians
Video game composers
Video game musicians